Sarah Mergenthaler (born 21 April 1979) is an American sports sailor.

She was born in Red Bank, New Jersey, United States, and graduated from [[Marlboro High School.

She competed at the 2008 Summer Olympics in Beijing, People's Republic of China in the women's 470. Sailing alongside Amanda Clark the pair finished in 12th position.

References

1979 births
Living people
American female sailors (sport)
Olympic sailors of the United States
Sailors at the 2008 Summer Olympics – 470
Marlboro High School alumni
People from Red Bank, New Jersey
Sportspeople from Monmouth County, New Jersey
21st-century American women